The Monkee's Uncle is an album by Altamont. It was released in 2005 through AntAcidAudio.

Critical reception
AllMusic wrote: "Highlights include the barnstorming album opener, 'Frank Bank,' the surprisingly up-tempo ditty 'El Stupido,' and the riff monster 'The Bloodening.'" SF Weekly wrote that the album "represents a merrily uneasy alliance betwixt headbanging and finesse." LA Weekly called the album "a binary black hole swallowing up pop and hard rock and spitting them out into other dimensions as noise and gentle terror."

Track listing
"Frank Bank" (Altamont) – 3:25
"Bathroom Creep" (Altamont) – 2:51
"Dum Dum Fever" (Altamont) – 5:40
"El Stupido" (Altamont) – 4:40
"Laughing Boy" (Altamont) – 4:19
"Pedigree" (Altamont) – 3:19
"Monkee's Uncle" (Altamont) – 2:45
"The Bloodening" (Altamont) – 2:50
"Easter Sunday" (Altamont) – 7:09
"Bull Ramus" (Altamont) – 2:11
"In A Better World" (The Screamers) – 2:30

Personnel
Dale Crover - Vocals, Various instruments
Dan Southwick - guitar, bass guitar, Drums
Joey Osbourne - drums
Toshi Kasai - piano, Organ, Engineer, Producer
Sasha Popovich - drums

References

Altamont (band) albums
2005 albums